Camargo is a village in Douglas County, Illinois, United States.  The population was 452 at the 2020 census. Camargo is at the intersection of Illinois Route 130 and U.S. Route 36. Camargo is the oldest township in Douglas County. In 2006, the first annual Camargo Woolly Worm Festival was launched during the first weekend in October, attracting several local celebrities. This is to be an annual event.

Geography

Demographics

As of the 2020 census there were 452 people, 205 households, and 142 families residing in the village. The racial makeup of the village was 94.03% White, 0.22% Native American, 0.66% from other races, and 5.09% from two or more races. Hispanic or Latino of any race were 1.77% of the population.

There were 205 households, out of which 57.56% had children under the age of 18 living with them, 57.56% were married couples living together, 6.83% had a female householder with no husband present, and 30.73% were non-families. 25.85% of all households were made up of individuals, and 11.22% had someone living alone who was 65 years of age or older. The average household size was 3.24 and the average family size was 2.68.

The village's age distribution consisted of 22.7% under the age of 18, 4.2% from 18 to 24, 19.3% from 25 to 44, 32.9% from 45 to 64, and 20.9% who were 65 years of age or older. The median age was 46.9 years. For every 100 females, there were 87.1 males. For every 100 females age 18 and over, there were 83.2 males.

The median income for a household in the village was $60,469, and the median income for a family was $70,313. Males had a median income of $53,125 versus $24,375 for females. The per capita income for the village was $25,883. About 6.3% of families and 6.2% of the population were below the poverty line, including 10.4% of those under age 18 and 5.2% of those age 65 or over.

See also

 List of municipalities in Illinois

References

External links

 

Villages in Douglas County, Illinois
Villages in Illinois